Jump is an album by guitarist Jimmy Ponder that was released by Muse in 1989.

Reception 

In his review on AllMusic, Ron Wynn stated "Ponder is a good guitarist in the Grant Green school, a fine soul/blues player.".

Track listing 
All compositions by Jimmy Ponder except where noted
 "I'll Always Be There" – 5:00
 "You Stepped Out of a Dream" (Nacio Herb Brown, Gus Kahn) – 5:35
 "Blues for Betty" – 4:02
 "When Love Comes My Way" – 5:33
 "My Romance" (Richard Rodgers, Lorenz Hart) – 4:23	
 "Stormy Monday" (T-Bone Walker) – 5:43
 "Jump" – 6:02
 "In a Mellow Tone" (Duke Ellington) – 6:26

Personnel 
Jimmy Ponder – guitar, vocals
James Anderson – tenor saxophone
Big John Patton – organ 
Geary Moore – rhythm guitar 
Eddie Gladden – drums
Lawrance Killien - percussion

References 

Jimmy Ponder albums
1989 albums
Muse Records albums
Albums recorded at Van Gelder Studio